The Southern Andean Volcano Observatory (Spanish: Observatorio Volcanológico de los Andes del Sur), also known by its acronyms as OVDAS, is part of Red Nacional de Vigilancia Volcánica, a program of the Chilean National Geology and Mining Service to watch the 43 most dangerous volcanoes of Chile. 2012 there were 30 volcanos under observation.

This is a list of the volcanoes with activity reports made by the OVDAS.

The headquarters are at Cerro Ñielol at Temuco from where there is good sight to Llaima and Villarrica, two of Chile's most active volcanoes. Much of the OVDAS work is made in collaboration with CONAF that administers the national parks and reserves where many volcanoes are located. The regional government of Araucanía Region also contributed to the project.

See also
List of volcanoes in Chile

References

External links
OVDAS website
Archivo nacional de volcanes

Volcano observatories
Andean Volcanic Belt
Buildings and structures in La Araucanía Region
.
Volcanism of Chile